Tykho Moon  is a 1996 French-German science fiction film directed by Enki Bilal.

Cast 
 Julie Delpy - Lena
 Johan Leysen - Anikst
 Michel Piccoli - McBee
 Marie Laforêt - Eva
 Richard Bohringer - Glenbaar
 Yann Collette - Alvin / Edward

Reception
The film opened in France on 9 screens and grossed $35,790 for the week finishing 15th at the box office.

References

External links 
 
 

French science fiction films
1996 science fiction films
1996 films
1990s French films